Moongilpalayam is a village in Anthiyur taluk, Erode district of Tamil Nadu, India.  It is about 40 km from Erode and 25 km from Bhavani travelling north-east on highway 175.  The village of Ennamangalam is about 1 km north.  Moongilpalayam has a population of over 200 families (1,423 in 1991 census).  Moongilpalayam is surrounded by three lakes; Ennamangalam Lake to the north, Getti Samuthiram Lake to the south, and Raasangulam Yeri to the south-east.  One of the biggest dams in India, the Mettur Dam is about 20 km distance and the Varattu Pallam Dam is 3 km distance.

References
Director of Census Operations, Tamil Nadu, Census of India, 1991: Series 23, Tamil Nadu, pp. 128, 344, New Delhi : Controller of Publications, 1992 .

Villages in Erode district